Pannaiyarum Padminiyum is a 2014 Indian Tamil-language comedy drama film directed by debutant S. U. Arun Kumar, based on his own eponymous short-film. Arun Kumar was a contestant in Naalaya Iyakunar . It features Vijay Sethupathi, Jayaprakash, and Aishwarya Rajesh in the lead roles, with Thulasi, Bala Saravanan, Neelima Rani, and Mahadevan in supporting roles. Sneha and Attakathi Dinesh appear in brief guest roles. Music for the film was composed by debutant Justin Prabhakaran and editing by A. Sreekar Prasad while the cinematography is by Gokul Binoy.

The film revolves around an old man and his love for his vintage car Premier Padmini. The film began production in January 2013 and released on 7 February 2014 to critical acclaim and positive reviews.

Plot 

The movie begins with a young man buying a new car, he says that his inspiration is from a Pannaiyar (landlord) in his village and his love for a vintage Fiat Premier Padmini car.

Pannaiyar and his wife Chellamma are kindhearted and broadminded people who are responsible for introducing essential technologies like TV, radio, telephones, etc., to their villagers. The villagers also enjoy the liberty of using all these items with his permission. The couple have a married daughter named Suja, who is greedy. Whenever she visits, she makes it a point to take whichever device she finds pleasing to her eye.

One day, Pannaiyar's friend Shanmugam comes to his house with his brand new Fiat Premier Padmini car and Pannaiyar is instantly awestruck by the latest car's features. To Pannaiyar's surprise and happiness, Shanmugam says that he will leave the car for a few months under Pannaiyar's care since he is going to visit his pregnant daughter and gives his consent to Pannaiyar to use the car as he wishes. Since then, an excited Pannaiyar takes care of it like a prized possession. Since he does not know how to drive, he appoints a young man named Murugesan as the driver and the household servant Peedai as the cleaner. Pannaiyar and Chellamma treat them like their own sons. School-going kids often swarm around the car asking for a ride in the front seat, and one little boy in particular is very much interested, so Peedai jokingly asks him to bring five rupees to get a front seat ride, and the boy starts saving his pocket money sincerely day by day. Like all the other facilities belonging to Pannaiyar, the villagers also get to use the car for their emergency purposes. On one such day, when Murugesan is helping a family at a funeral, he comes across a beautiful girl named Malarvizhi among the mourners. He is attracted to her instantly and she also falls for him, and they start to love each other.

One night, Chellamma requests her husband to learn driving before their wedding anniversary so that they can go to the temple together, he obliges. Pannaiyar is determined to learn driving and asks Murugesan to train him. Murugesan fears that he will lose his job if Pannaiyar learns driving, so he procrastinates as much as he can. So, Pannaiyar's driving progress is very slow. Meanwhile, Shanmugam's daughter unexpectedly visits them and says that her father suddenly died. Pannaiyar is shocked to hear about the loss of his friend and hands over the car keys and the documents that Shanmugam left under his care. But the daughter leaves the car behind as a token of remembrance of her father. Now that they are the proud owners of the car, the Pannaiyar family is happy, and certain heartwarming incidents change Murugesan's mind and he wholeheartedly plans to teach Pannaiyar to drive, but during one of his lessons, Pannaiyar causes an accident that creates minor damages to the car, which starts having technical difficulties from then onwards.

Meanwhile, Suja visits her parents and her eyes fall on the new car and she demands for it. Unable to refuse, Pannaiyar halfheartedly lets her take it, much to the disappointment of Murugesan and Chellamma. On Pannaiyar and Chellamma's wedding anniversary, as the family is preparing to get into a bullock cart to go to the temple, they see an irate Suja coming to their house with the car. She says that she and her husband would have been in an accident because the car stopped working and insults her father for giving a useless old car. Chellamma steps in and scolds her and Suja storms away angrily, leaving the car behind. Murugesan, Pannaiyar and Chellamma dismiss Suja's tantrum and are rather pleased that their car is finally back. They try to start the car but it would not start. In utter frustration, Peedai jumps over the car and sits on the bonnet, and suddenly it starts. Finally, as per their earlier plan, Pannaiyar manages to drive successfully and take his wife Chellamma in his own car to the temple on their anniversary. They even race a bus driver, who was being a bully for quite a while.

Meanwhile, the little boy who saved money to get a front seat ride sadly leaves out of town for higher studies without his wish  fulfilled. Years later, that boy turns out to be the young man who bought a new car at the beginning of the movie. He visits his hometown and searches for the old car in Pannaiyar's house. Murugesan sees the man and asks if he needs a ride to the town. The man says yes and finally sits in the front seat of the car, and his longtime wish is fulfilled at last as they drive away.

Cast 
 Vijay Sethupathi as Murugesan
 Jayaprakash as Pannaiyar
 Aishwarya Rajesh as Malarvizhi
 Thulasi as Chellamma 
 Bala Saravanan as Peedai
 Neelima Rani as Suja
 Mahadevan as Shanmugam
 Sneha as Shanmugam's daughter (Guest appearance)
 Dinesh as the narrator (Guest appearance)
 Senthil Nayagam as the narrator (Guest appearance)
 Gaja as the narrator (Guest appearance)

Production
Pannaiyarum Padminiyum is based on the short film of the same name.

Release
Pannaiyarum Padminiyum was released on 7 February 2014. The film was screened in many International Film Festivals such as Jargar Film Festival, Prague International Film Festival, Habitat Film Festival, 12th Chennai International Film Festival (CIFF), 7th Bengaluru International Film Festival (BIFFES)  in which it won the special jury award. It was the only Tamil film selected to be screened at the 19th International Film Festival of Kerala (IFFK).

Critical reception
Upon release, the film opened to predominantly positive reviews from critics. Baradwaj Rangan of The Hindu described the film as "sweetly old-fashioned" but felt that "developments have been dreamed up simply to pad out the running time" and that "the scenes and characters (added to make a feature film from a short), sometimes, feel like editing-room discards that are rightfully DVD extras". Sify called it "a feel good and charming emotional drama" but that the length was "the film’s Achilles heels as it stretches and goes on and on, making it boring at times". IANS gave it 4.5/5 and wrote, "In a list featuring films that tug at your heart strings, Pannaiyarum Padminiyum deserves to be right on the top. An emotionally uplifting work, the film steers away from the commercial zone by constantly rewarding us with characters that not just entertain but stay with us hours after we leave the cinema hall". Bharath Vijaykumar of Moviecrow gave 3.5/5 and concluded, "A pleasant drive sans any bump that makes you soak in unadulterated emotions and leaves a smile in your face.". The Times of India gave the film 3.5/5 and wrote, "Expanding his much-loved short film into a full-length feature, Arunkumar shows that he is a capable storyteller. He takes his time spinning his yarn but there is an assuredness in the telling that keeps you hooked". Indiaglitz gave 3.5/5 and wrote, "Arun's direction deserves much more than appreciation, one for coming up with a clean family entertaining movie, two for bringing out a full length picture out of a short story" and added "the screenplay could have been a little quicker for the sentimental scenes look very stretchy and could have been made thinner". Rediff gave it 3/5 and called the film "refreshing" and "a realistic story about the lives of ordinary people and their simple desires". Behindwoods gave it 3/5 and wrote that it "brims with charm, sentiment and carries a lot of feel-good factor". S. Rajasekar of Cinemalead wrote "the director seems to have lengthen the duration to avoid short film feel. Had the film's running time is just 120 minutes without deviating from the core subject it would have been a cult classic." and rated it with 2.5/5 stars.

Soundtrack 
The soundtrack album was composed by Justin Prabhakaran, and the lyrics were written by Vaali and the composer himself.

Remake
Even before the release of Pannaiyarum Padminiyum, actor Nani had purchased the Telugu remake rights of the film.

References

External links
 

2014 films
Features based on short films
Films about automobiles
2010s Tamil-language films
Indian comedy-drama films
Films scored by Justin Prabhakaran
Films about landlords
2014 directorial debut films
Indian romantic drama films